Gao Xiumin may refer to:

 Gao Xiumin (actress) (1959–2005), Chinese actress
 Gao Xiumin (handballer) (born 1963), Chinese Olympic handball player